Pocket Universe is the ninth studio album by the Swiss band Yello, released on 24 February 1997 through Mercury label.

Track listing
All songs by Blank/Meier unless otherwise noted.
"Solar Driftwood" – 1:51
"Celsius" – 5:59
"More" – 6:39
"On Track" – 5:33
"Monolith" – 6:21
"To the Sea" (Blank, Nordenstam) – 5:46
"Magnetic" – 5:53
"Liquid Mountain" – 2:58
"Pan Blue" – 5:31
"Resistor" – 7:13
"Beyond Mirrors" – 5:49

CD Bonus Track

12. "To the Sea (Steve B-Zet Remix)" – 3:52

Personnel
Yello – Main Performer, Producer
Leos Gerteis – Producer
Ian Tregoning – Producer
Carl Cox – Producer
Boris Blank – Producer, Arranger, Engineer
Dieter Meier – Vocals
Stina Nordenstam – Vocals
Kevin Metcalfe – Mastering

Charts
Singles – Billboard (United States)

References 

1997 albums
Yello albums
Mercury Records albums